KIIT Group of Institutions is a group of institutions run by KIIT Education Society in Bhubaneswar, Odisha, India. It includes KIIT University, Kalinga Institute of Medical Sciences, Kalinga Institute of Social Sciences and other institutes.

Programmes under KIIT University
B Tech and M Tech : offered from KIIT School of Technology separate school for every department
Master in Computer Application (MCA)established in 1997, BCA established in 2007 : offered from KIIT School of Computer Application
MBA and MBA (BIM), BBA  :Offered from KIIT School of Management, established in 1993
MBA in Rural Management (MRM):Offered from KIIT School of Rural Management (KSRM), started in 2007
B.Tech, M.Sc and PhD program in Biotechnology: Offered by KIIT School of Biotechnology (KSBT), starting from 2007
BBA.LL.B, BA.LL.B, B.Sc.LL.B AND LL.M Offered by KIIT Law School (KLS), started in 2007
Master in Journalism & Mass Communication
Bachelor of Fashion Design(B.Des)
Bachelor of Fashion Technology (B.F.Tech)
Master of Fashion Management
 PG Diploma Courses in Film & Television
Bachelor of Architecture(B.Arch)

Programmes under KIIT Society
MBBS : Offered from Kalinga Institute of Medical Sciences, Kusabhadra Campus.(KIMS)
BDS  : Offered by Kalinga Institute of Dental Sciences (KIDS)
Diploma Engineering : Offered from Kalinga Polytechnic , established in 1995
Certificate Courses  :Offered from KIIT Industrial Training Institute, established in 1992
KIIT International School
KIIT Science College: Pre-college education in science

Kalinga Institute of Medical Sciences and Pradyumna Bal Memorial Hospital
Conceived to provide health care facilities to the deprived poor. The Medical College is divided into 20 academic departments: providing the study, treatment, and prevention of human diseases, and maternity care and consists of a 500 bedded hospital with an expansion program of a multi specialty hospital to be opened very shortly.

Social Responsibility
As a successful institution located in one of the poorest State of India, KIIT University is aware of its social responsibility. The institute has been undertaking several social development activities under following two units.
Centre for Social Development  : established in 1994
Kalinga Institute of Social Sciences: established in 1994

Other programs

KiiT student activity center

 , campus 13,(ksac)

References

External links
 Official Website of KIIT

Universities and colleges in Bhubaneswar
Organisations based in Bhubaneswar
Educational institutions in India with year of establishment missing